Trachea melanospila is a moth of the family Noctuidae first described by Vincenz Kollar in 1844. It is found in Sri Lanka, Korea, Japan and Siberia.

References

Moths of Asia
Moths described in 1844
Hadeninae